The 1987–88 NCAA Division I men's basketball season began in November 1987 and ended with the Final Four in Kansas City, Missouri on April 4, 1988.

Season headlines

Major rule changes 
Beginning in 1987–88, the following rules changes were implemented:

Season outlook

Pre-season polls 
The top 20 from the AP Poll during the pre-season.

Conference membership changes 

These schools joined new conferences for the 1987–88 season.

Regular season

Conference winners and tournaments

Conference standings

Statistical leaders

Postseason tournaments

NCAA tournament

Final Four - Kemper Arena, Kansas City, Missouri

National Invitation tournament

NIT Semifinals and Final

Award winners

Consensus All-American teams

Major player of the year awards 

 Wooden Award: Danny Manning, Kansas
 Naismith Award: Danny Manning, Kansas
 Associated Press Player of the Year: Hersey Hawkins, Bradley
 UPI Player of the Year: Hersey Hawkins, Bradley
 NABC Player of the Year: Danny Manning, Kansas
 Oscar Robertson Trophy (USBWA): Hersey Hawkins, Bradley
 Adolph Rupp Trophy: Hersey Hawkins, Bradley
 Sporting News Player of the Year: Hersey Hawkins, Bradley

Major coach of the year awards 
 Associated Press Coach of the Year: John Chaney, Temple
 UPI Coach of the Year: John Chaney, Temple
 Henry Iba Award (USBWA): John Chaney, Temple
 NABC Coach of the Year: John Chaney, Temple
 Naismith College Coach of the Year: Larry Brown, Kansas
 CBS/Chevrolet Coach of the Year: John Chaney, Temple
 Sporting News Coach of the Year: John Chaney, Temple

Other major awards 
 Frances Pomeroy Naismith Award (Best player under 6'0): Jerry Johnson, Florida Southern
 Robert V. Geasey Trophy (Top player in Philadelphia Big 5): Lionel Simmons, La Salle
 NIT/Haggerty Award (Top player in New York City metro area): Mark Bryant, Seton Hall

Coaching changes 

A number of teams changed coaches during the season and after it ended.

References 

 
NCAA